Kotaro Shimano (born 8 June 1992) is a Japanese kickboxer, fighting out of Futtsu, Japan. He is the former Krush Super Featherweight champion.

As of 1 August 2020, he is ranked the #9 flyweight in the world by Combat Press. He first entered the rankings in May 2019.

Kickboxing career
Shimano enjoyed one of the best runs of his career in 2014, when he went on a five fight winning streak, including a first round TKO of Leona Pettas. This run earned a chance to fight Hirotaka Urabe for the Krush Super Featherweight title. He failed to capture the title, as Urabe won a unanimous decision.

He lost three of his next four fights, before entering the 2016 K-1 Super Featherweight Grand Prix. He managed a TKO win against Hitoshi Aketo in the quarterfinal, but lost by TKO to Koya Urabe in the semifinals.

In July 2016, Shimano fought Motoki for the MA Japan Kick Super Featherweight title. He won the fight by unanimous decision. He would lose two of his next three fights, before successfully defending the MA Japan title, with a second round KO of Ryoji Washio.

Shimano fought Masanobu Goshu for the Krush Super Featherweight title at Krush 89. He won the fight by unanimous decision. After defeating Rungphet Wor Rungniran, Shimano was scheduled to defend his Krush title for the first time at Krush 96, when he faced Tatsuya Oiwa. The fight went into an extra round, after which Shimano won a decision.

Shimano was scheduled to defend his Krush title for the second time against Yuma Saikyo at Krush 99. Saikyo won the fight by unanimous decision.

During the MA Japan Kick - Soeno Dojo 50th Anniversary event, Shimano was scheduled to fight Tapejyun Saichan for the WMAF World Super Featherweight title. He won the fight by a split decision, after an extra round was fought. He would follow this up with a second win with MA Japan, as he scored a knockout over Woo Seung Beom. Shimano extended his winning streak to four, with a unanimous decision win against Satoru Nariai, and a TKO win against Junpei Sano.

He was scheduled to fight Ryusei Ashizawa at K-1 World GP 2020 in Tokyo. Ashizawa won the fight by TKO in the second round after a back and forth round, during which both Ashizawa and Shimano were knocked down.

He won a unanimous decision against Yuki Miwa at K-1 World GP 2021: K’Festa 4 Day.2. Shimano was afterwards scheduled to fight Sano Tenma at K-1 World GP 2021: Japan Bantamweight Tournament.

Shimano was scheduled to face Hirotaka Urabe in a 61kg catchweight bout at K-1 World GP 2022 Japan on February 27, 2022. He won the fight by a third-round knockout, flooring Urabe with a right cross.

Shimano made his second WMAF World Super Featherweight title defense against Yugo Flyskygym at MA Japan Kick - Tekken 14 on August 28, 2022. He won the fight by knockout in the first minute.

Shimano faced the former Krush Featherweight and K-1 Featherweight champion Yuki Egawa at K-1 World GP 2022 in Osaka on December 3, 2022. He lost the fight by a first-round technical knockout.

Titles and accomplishments

 2014 Krush -60 kg WILDRUSH League Winner
 2016 MAJKF Super Featherweight Champion
 2018 Krush Super Featherweight Champion
 2019 WMAF World Super Featherweight Champion

Professional kickboxing record

|- style="background:#fbb;"
| 2022-12-03 || Loss ||align=left| Yuki Egawa ||  K-1 World GP 2022 in Osaka || Osaka, Japan || TKO (Punches) || 1 || 1:58
|- style="background:#cfc;"
| 2022-08-28|| Win ||align=left| Yugo Flyskygym ||  MAJKF - Tekken 14 || Tokyo, Japan || KO (Right hook) ||  1||0:50  
|-
! style=background:white colspan=9 |
|- style="background:#cfc;"
| 2022-02-27|| Win ||align=left| Hirotaka Urabe ||  K-1 World GP 2022 Japan || Tokyo, Japan || KO (Right cross) || 3||  2:51
|-  style="background:#fbb;"
| 2021-05-30|| Loss || align=left| Tenma Sano || K-1 World GP 2021: Japan Bantamweight Tournament || Tokyo, Japan || Decision (Unanimous)|| 3 ||3:00
|-  style="background:#cfc;"
| 2021-03-28|| WIn  ||align=left| Yuki Miwa || K-1 World GP 2021: K’Festa 4 Day.2 || Tokyo, Japan || Decision (Unanimous) || 3||3:00
|-  style="background:#fbb;"
| 2020-12-13|| Loss || align=left| Ryusei Ashizawa || K-1 World GP 2020 Winter's Crucial Bout|| Tokyo, Japan || KO (Punches) || 2 || 3:00
|-  style="background:#cfc;"
| 2020-09-26|| Win||align=left| Junpei Sano || Krush.117 || Tokyo, Japan || KO (3 Knockdowns)|| 1 || 1:32
|-  style="background:#cfc;"
| 2019-12-15|| Win||align=left| Satoru Nariai || Krush.109 || Tokyo, Japan || Decision (Unanimous)|| 3 || 3:00
|-  style="background:#cfc;"
| 2019-07-07|| Win||align=left| Woo Seung Beom || MAJKF - Tekken 12 || Chiba (city), Japan || KO (Right Straight)|| 1 || 2:51
|-  style="background:#cfc;"
| 2019-04-21|| Win||align=left| Tapejyun Saichan || MAJKF - Soeno Dojo 50th Anniversary || Tokyo, Japan || Ext.R Decision (Split)|| 4 || 3:00
|-
! style=background:white colspan=9 |
|-  style="background:#fbb;"
| 2019-03-09|| Loss ||align=left| Yuma Saikyo || Krush.99 || Tokyo, Japan || Decision (Unanimous)|| 3 || 3:00
|-
! style=background:white colspan=9 |
|-  style="background:#cfc;"
| 2018-12-16|| Win||align=left| Tatsuya Oiwa || Krush.96 || Tokyo, Japan || Ext.R Decision (Unanimous)|| 4 || 3:00
|-
! style=background:white colspan=9 |
|-  style="background:#cfc;"
| 2018-07-29|| Win||align=left| Rungphet Wor Rungniran || MAJKF - Tekken 11 || Chiba (city), Japan || Decision (Unanimous)|| 3 || 3:00
|-  style="background:#cfc;"
| 2018-06-30|| Win||align=left| Masanobu Goshu || Krush.89 || Tokyo, Japan || Decision (Unanimous)|| 3 || 3:00
|-
! style=background:white colspan=9 |
|-  style="background:#cfc;"
| 2018-03-10|| Win||align=left| Naoki Yamamoto || Krush.86 || Tokyo, Japan || KO (Left Hook)|| 1 || 1:53
|-  style="background:#fbb;"
| 2017-09-18|| Loss||align=left| Kouzi || K-1 World GP 2016 -60kg World Tournament || Tokyo, Japan|| Decision (Unanimous) || 3 || 3:00
|-  style="background:#cfc;"
| 2017-07-17|| Win||align=left| Jira Banchamek || MAJKF - Tekken 10 || Chiba (city), Japan || Decision (Unanimous)|| 3 || 3:00
|-  style="background:#cfc;"
| 2017-04-30|| Win||align=left| Ryoji Washio || MAJKF - Festival of Martial Arts～FIGHT FOR PEACE8～ || Tokyo, Japan || KO || 2 || 1:51
|-
! style=background:white colspan=9 |
|-  style="background:#cfc;"
| 2017-03-03|| Win||align=left| "Dynamite" Yuta Takahashi || Krush.74 || Tokyo, Japan || Decision (Unanimous)|| 3 || 3:00
|-  style="background:#fbb;"
| 2016-12-04|| Loss||align=left| Ryuki || MAJKF - Tekken 9|| Japan || Decision (Majority) || 3 || 3:00
|-  style="background:#fbb;"
| 2016-10-15|| Loss ||align=left| Hayato || Krush.70 || Tokyo, Japan || Decision (Unanimous)|| 3 || 3:00
|-  style="background:#cfc;"
| 2016-07-24|| Win||align=left| Motoki ||MAJKF - Tekken 8 || Chiba (city), Japan || Decision (Unanimous) || 3 || 3:00
|-
! style=background:white colspan=9 |
|-  style="background:#fbb;"
| 2016-04-24|| Loss||align=left| Koya Urabe || K-1 World GP 2016 -60kg Japan Tournament, Semi Finals || Tokyo, Japan|| KO (Left Low Kicks) || 2 || 0:51
|-  style="background:#cfc;"
| 2016-04-24|| Win ||align=left| Hitoshi Aketo || K-1 World GP 2016 -60kg Japan Tournament, Quarter Finals || Tokyo, Japan|| KO (2 Knockdows/Left Hook) || 1 || 2:55
|-  style="background:#fbb;"
| 2016-02-05|| Loss ||align=left| Hitoshi Aketo || Krush.63 || Tokyo, Japan|| Ext.R Decision (Unanimous) || 4 || 3:00
|-  style="background:#fbb;"
| 2016-02-05|| Loss ||align=left| Fumiya Osawa || K-1 World GP 2015 The Championship || Tokyo, Japan|| Decision (Unanimous) || 3 || 3:00
|-  style="background:#cfc;"
| 2015-10-11|| Win||align=left| Kensuke Tomita|| MAJKF - Tekken 7 || Tokyo, Japan || TKO (Corner Stoppage) || 1 || 2:03
|-  bgcolor="#fbb"
| 2015-01-18 || Loss||align=left| Javier Hernandez || K-1 World GP 2015 -60kg Championship Tournament, Quarter Finals || Tokyo, Japan || Decision (Unanimous)|| 3 || 3:00
|-  style="background:#fbb;"
| 2014-11-09|| Loss||align=left| Hirotaka Urabe || Krush.47 || Tokyo, Japan || Decision (Unanimous)|| 3 || 3:00
|-
! style=background:white colspan=9 |
|-  style="background:#cfc;"
| 2014-10-05 || Win|| align=left| Tomohiro Kitai || Krush.46 || Tokyo, Japan || KO (Left Hook) || 1 || 0:28
|-  style="background:#cfc;"
| 2014-09-16|| Win||align=left| Shota Hamada|| MAJKF - Tekken 6 || Chiba (city), Japan ||  Decision (Unanimous)|| 3 || 3:00
|-  style="background:#cfc;"
| 2014-07-13 || Win|| align=left| Toshi || Krush.43 || Tokyo, Japan || KO (Punches) || 2 || 2:32
|-  style="background:#cfc;"
| 2014-05-11 || Win|| align=left| Takeshi Watanabe || Krush.41 || Tokyo, Japan || Decision (Unanimous)|| 3 || 3:00
|-  style="background:#cfc;"
| 2014-03-08 || Win|| align=left| Leona Pettas || Krush.39 || Tokyo, Japan || TKO (Doctor Stoppage)|| 1 || 1:03
|-  style="background:#fbb;"
| 2014-01-04|| Loss ||align=left| Fumiya Osawa || Krush 36 || Tokyo, Japan|| Decision (Majority) || 3 || 3:00
|-  style="background:#fbb;"
| 2013-10-13|| Loss ||align=left| Go Kato || Krush-IGNITION 2013 vol.7 || Tokyo, Japan|| Decision (Majority) || 3 || 3:00
|-  style="background:#cfc;"
| 2012-11-23 || Win|| align=left| Satoi || Krush-EX 2012 vol.6 || Tokyo, Japan || KO (Left Hook) || 3 || 0:46
|-  style="background:#cfc;"
| 2012-07-29|| Win||align=left| Ryoji ||MAJKF - Tekken 5 || Chiba (city), Japan ||  KO || 1 ||
|-  style="background:#fbb;"
| 2012-06-17 || Loss|| align=left| Go Kato || Krush-EX 2012 vol.3 || Tokyo, Japan || KO  || 3 || 0:52
|-  style="background:#fbb;"
| 2012-04-08|| Loss ||align=left| Hirotaka Hadachi || NJKF Superkick || Chiba (city), Japan || Decision (Unanimous) || 3 || 3:00
|-  style="background:#cfc;"
| 2012-02-17|| Win ||align=left| Tomohiro Kitai || Krush 16 || Tokyo, Japan|| KO (Right Straight) || 1 || 1:01
|-  style="background:#cfc;"
| 2011-12-10|| Win ||align=left| Takashi Ohata || Krush‐EX 2011 FINAL || Tokyo, Japan|| KO (Right Straight) || 3 || 0:55
|-  style="background:#cfc;"
| 2011-11-12|| Win ||align=left| Susumu Sekine || Krush 13 || Tokyo, Japan|| Decision (Unanimous) || 3 || 3:00
|-  style="background:#cfc;"
| 2011-07-31|| Win ||align=left|  ||  || Hua Hin, Thailand|| KO || 3 ||
|-
| colspan=9 | Legend:

See also
 List of male kickboxers

References

Living people
1992 births
Japanese male kickboxers
Flyweight kickboxers
People from Futtsu
Sportspeople from Chiba Prefecture